The Progressive Democratic Alliance is a political party in Equatorial Guinea. Its most prominent figure is Victorino Bolekia Bonay, the Mayor of Malabo and the first person democratically elected to that post. Bolekia is a well-known opponent of the government, and he has been detained by the government during elections.

Political parties in Equatorial Guinea